Georges Serge Grün (born 25 January 1962) is a retired Belgian football defender, who currently works as a television presenter for the UEFA Champions League matches at RTL TVI.

Club career
Grün started his career with Anderlecht in Belgium, where he spent eight seasons, winning the UEFA Cup in 1983, as well as three consecutive Belgian First Division titles between 1984 and 1987, among other trophies; he also reached another UEFA Cup final with the club in 1984, where they lost out to English side Tottenham, however. Grün joined Italian club Parma in 1990. During his time with the club, he established himself as one of the best defenders in Serie A, winning the Coppa Italia in 1992, and the Cup Winners' Cup in 1993 under manager Nevio Scala. Following a series of injury struggles during the 1993–94 season, however, he returned to his former club in 1994. In 1996, he returned to Italy once again, to play for Reggiana; however, he was no longer paid by the club between February and May 1997, and retired at the end of the 1996–97 season.

International career
Grün made his international debut in a 2–0 win against Yugoslavia at UEFA Euro 1984, on 13 June, marking the occasion with a goal. He is most famous in his home country for scoring the away goal that qualified Belgium at the expense of their neighbours Netherlands in the 1986 World Cup qualifying rounds. Belgium would go on to a very respectable fourth-place finish. He played in three FIFA World Cups for the Belgium national football team (1986, 1990 and 1994). He made his World Cup debut against Mexico on 3 June 1986. Grün is the sixth–most–capped player for Belgium with 77 appearances between 1984 and 1995, also scoring six goals.

Style of play
Usually a defender, Grün was capable of playing both as a man-marking centre-back, or stopper, and as a sweeper, due to his elegance, as well as his ability carry the ball out from the back and advance into midfield, or play it out on the ground, which enabled him to start attacking plays with his passing after winning back possession. He was even deployed as a defensive midfielder in front of the back-line on occasion.

Honours

Player 

 Anderlecht

 Belgian First Division: 1980–81, 1984–85, 1985–86, 1986–87
 Belgian Cup: 1987-88, 1988-89
 Belgian Supercup: 1985, 1987
 UEFA Cup: 1982–83 (winners), 1983-84 (runners-up)
 European Cup Winners' Cup: 1989-90 (runners-up)
 Jules Pappaert Cup: 1983, 1985
 Bruges Matins: 1985, 1988

 Parma

 Coppa Italia: 1991–92
 European Cup Winners' Cup: 1992–93 (winners), 1993-94 (runners-up)
 European Super Cup: 1993

International 
Belgium

 FIFA World Cup: 1986 (fourth place)

Individual 

 Ballon d'Or nomination: 1993
DH The Best RSC Anderlecht Team Ever (2020) 
IFFHS All Time Belgium Dream Team (2021)

References

External links
 
 
 

1962 births
1986 FIFA World Cup players
1990 FIFA World Cup players
1994 FIFA World Cup players
A.C. Reggiana 1919 players
Belgian expatriate footballers
Belgian Pro League players
Belgian footballers
Belgium international footballers
Expatriate footballers in Italy
Belgian expatriate sportspeople in Italy
Association football central defenders
Living people
Parma Calcio 1913 players
R.S.C. Anderlecht players
Serie A players
UEFA Euro 1984 players
People from Schaerbeek
Association football defenders
Belgian people of German descent
Footballers from Brussels